Frances Courtenay Baylor Barnum (January 20, 1848,  – October 15, 1920) was an American author of fiction.

Biography
Frances Courtenay Baylor was born in Fort Smith, Arkansas on January 20, 1848. Her father, James Dawson, was an army officer, and her childhood was spent in San Antonio and New Orleans, where her father was stationed. During her teen years her parents divorced and Frances began using her mother's maiden name, Baylor. After the Civil War ended, she spent several years (1865–67, 1873–74) traveling and living in Europe.

In the late 1870s, she began contributing articles to newspapers and periodicals such as the Atlantic Monthly and the Princeton Review. In 1885 she published a well-received first novel, On Both Sides, that examined the differing manners and customs of American and English society.

Family
In 1896 Frances married George Barnum, who died shortly after they were wed.  After his death she moved to Winchester, Virginia, where she spent the remainder of her life.

She died in Winchester on October 15, 1920.

Bibliography
On Both Sides (1885)
Behind the Blue Ridge (1887)
Juan and Juanita (1888)
A Shocking Example, and Other Sketches (1889)
Claudia  Hyde (1894)
Miss Nina Barrow (1897)
The Ladder of Fortune (1899)
A Georgian Bungalow (1900)

References

Further reading
Gordon, Amistead Virginia Writers of Fugitive Verse. New York: James T. White, 1922.
Mishler, Catherine T. "Baylor, Frances Courtenay." Edited by John T. Kneebone, J. Jefferson Looney, Brent Tarter, and Sandra Gioia Treadway. Vol. I of The Dictionary of Virginia Biography. Richmond, VA: The Library of Virginia, 1998.
Taylor, Welford D. Virginia Authors Past and Present. Richmond, VA: Association of Teachers of English, 1972.

External links
 

1848 births
1920 deaths
19th-century American novelists
American women novelists
19th-century American women writers
Wikipedia articles incorporating text from A Woman of the Century